Terrence John Douglas (born 14 September 2001) is a Dutch professional footballer who plays as a left-back for Eerste Divisie club Roda JC.

Club career

Ajax
Douglas began his football career with Zeeburgia, where he played until 2009. At the age of seven he moved to the youth academy of Ajax. In the 2016–17 season he was in the under-17 squad for the first time. In the following season he developed into a regular player for the side and made a total of 26 appearances, including one call-up for the under-19 team. The following season he played 21 gamed for the under-19 team and also made two appearances in the UEFA Youth League. At the end of the season he won the domestic double with the U19s.

He made his debut for Jong Ajax under head coach Michael Reiziger on 25 March 2019 against Jong Utrecht. The following season he finished the season with 21 appearances for the under-19 team, of which he played seven times in the UEFA Youth League, where he scored once – in a 1–1 draw against Chelsea.

In 2020–21 he became a regular starter for Jong Ajax. He scored his first professional goal against Jong Utrecht on 19 October 2020.

Loan to FC Den Bosch
On 31 January 2022, Douglas moved to FC Den Bosch on loan for the remainder of the 2021–22 season, with an option to make the transfer permanent upon the completion of the loan. He made his competitive debut for the club on 6 February against ADO Den Haag, starting at left-back and impressing at the position despite the game ending in a 1–0 loss.

Roda JC
On 1 July 2022, Douglas signed a two-year contract with Eerste Divisie club Roda JC Kerkrade. He made his competitive debut for the club on 12 August, starting at left-back in a 1–0 home victory over his former club Jong Ajax. On 5 February 2023, in a local derby against MVV, Douglas scored his first goal and the matchwinner
for Roda off a header from Sami Ouaissa's corner-kick to secure a 2–1 home win.

International career
Born in the Netherlands, Douglas is of Surinamese descent. Douglas is a youth international for the Netherlands, having gained 16 caps at different youth levels.

Career statistics

References

External links
 

2001 births
Living people
Dutch footballers
Netherlands youth international footballers
Dutch sportspeople of Surinamese descent
Association football defenders
A.V.V. Zeeburgia players
AFC Ajax players
Jong Ajax players
FC Den Bosch players
Roda JC Kerkrade players
Eerste Divisie players
Footballers from Amsterdam